Kumashpur, also spelled Kumaspur and Kumaspura, is a village within Municipal Corporation of Sonipat in Sonipat district of Haryana. It is 11 km from Sonipat Junction railway station, 45 km from Maharana Pratap Inter State Bus Terminus at Kashmiri Gate, Delhi, and 190 km from Chandigarh on NH1 Grand Trunk Road.

Etymology 
Kumashpur was known as "Kammasadamma" in pali language Buddhist texts and the "Kamas Nigam" in Sanskrit texts, which later came to be known as "Kamas Dham", and finally in its present corrupted form as "Kumashpura" which has been shortened to "Kumashpur".

History
During vedic era, it was part of Kuru Kingdom of Mahabharata. In 545 BCE, Buddha visited "Kammasadamma" as mentioned in the Pāli Canon of Theravada Buddhism. At the time of Buddha's visit, Kumashpur was a trading hub. He chose this place to give his famed discourse called Mahasatipatthana sutta. Buddha said he chose this place for "Mahasatipatthana" because it was the land of virtuous and moral Kuru people who practiced sila (five core tenets of Buddhism), hence they were more suited to receive and grasp the details of "Mahasatipatthana sutta". Since people of Kuru kingdom were moral people who were already following "sila", Buddha did not include the learning of "sila" in "Mahasatipatthana sutta" discourse.

"Mahasatipatthana sutta", which means "The Great Discourse on the Establishing of Mindfulness", stresses the practice of sati (mindfulness) for realization of nirvana, and this sutta later became the foundation for vipassanā yoga meditation. In 1997-98 from the ancient Pali Tharaveda Buddhist texts, Satya Narayan Goenka traced the association of Kumashpura with the Kammasadamma and Buddha's "Mahasatipatthana sutta" discourse at this place. He build a pagoda and vipassana meditation centre here. Goenka, a sanatani Hindu born in Burma to Marwari Indian parents, learnt vipassana from Sayagyi U Ba Khin and became a vipassana teacher and founder of meditation centres in India, Thailand and other nations. For his services to the society, Goenka was awarded the Padma Bhushan in 2012 by the government of India.

Pagoda and vipasana Centre

Dhamma Patthana Vipasana Centre, built on 7.5 acres, has "Aastha Pugdal Pagoda" with 63 meditation cells, 2 Dhamma meditation halls, 59 resort style standalone cottages with attached bathroom which can house 33 male and 22 female yoga practitioners. Centre offers 10 days to 45 days meditation courses. "Dhamma Paṭṭhāna", meaning "established in dhamma" in Pali language, is the sacred site where Buddha gave the famous "Mahāsatipaṭṭhāna Sutta[" (Maha Sutta).

See also
 Bodh Stupa
 Global Vipassana Pagoda
 Golden Pagoda, Namsai
 Buddhist pilgrimage sites in Haryana
 Buddhist pilgrimage sites
 Buddhist pilgrimage sites in India

References

Notes

Citations

External links
 Vipassana Research Institute, founder of pagoda at Kumashpur.

Villages in Sonipat district
Pagodas in India
Buddhist pilgrimage sites in India
Buddhist sites in India